Śri Wijaya Mahadewi of Bali (floruit 983), was a queen regnant of the Kingdom of Bali in 983-989.

She is attested from the Gobleg inscription, in which she granted her gave permission to the residents of Air Tabar to become the guardian of the Indrapura Temple located within the village of Air Tabar.

She did not use the sign of the Warmadewa dynasty, which has been the subject of a number of theories. It has been suggested that she came from Srivijaya, signifying how the power of Srivijaya had expanded to Bali. Another opinion is the she was the daughter of king Mpu Sindok. 

Sri Wijaya Mahadewi died in 989 and left the throne to a king and a queen in co-regency.

References 

 Marwati Djoened Poesponegoro, Nugroho Notosusanto: Sejarah nasional Indonesia: untuk SMP. Departemen Pendidikan dan Kebudayaan, 1984

10th-century women rulers
Queens regnant in Asia
Monarchs of Bali
Indonesian Hindu monarchs
10th-century Indonesian women